Alain Noudéhou (born 1966) is a Beninese diplomat who has been serving as Deputy Special Representative for the United Nations Multidimensional Integrated Stabilization Mission in Mali (MINUSMA) and Resident Coordinator in Mali since 2021, serving alongside Special Representative Mahamat Saleh Annadif. He was previously the Deputy Special Representative of the Secretary-General of the United Nations, Resident Coordinator, and Humanitarian Coordinator in South Sudan.

Early life and education
Noudéhou holds a master's degree in Public Policy and Management from Carnegie Mellon University in the US and completed his undergraduate degree at Tsinghua University in China.

Career

Early career
Before joining the UN, Noudéhou became the first Country Director of CHF (now Global Communities) in South Africa from 1996- 2000 and later as the Deputy Director of Program Initiatives at CHF Headquarters in Maryland, USA (2000 – 2002). As Country Director in South Africa, he successfully designed and implemented CHF's affordable housing and bridge financing programs within the framework of the South African Government's Reconstruction and Development Program. Working with the municipality and through an assisted-self‐help approach, more than 900 affordable houses were built between 1996 and 2000.

Career with the United Nations
Noudéhou started his career with the United Nations in 2002 as UNDP Assistant Resident Representative in Gabon and then moved to Rwanda as UNDP Deputy Representative in Rwanda in 2004. In 2007, he moved to Tanzania as UNDP's Country Director.

The Secretary General of the United Nations Ban Ki-moon in July 2010, announced Noudéhou as UN Resident Coordinator, Humanitarian Coordinator and UNDP Resident Representative in Zimbabwe. He led the UN's efforts to deliver the required advisory and implementation support services – including support of the development of the country's first post-independence constitution. Under his leadership, UNDP Zimbabwe managed an overall program delivery of US$410 million for the 3-year period of 2010 to 2012, one the three biggest UNDP programs on the continent.

Before moving to South Sudan, Noudéhou served as Chief of Staff and Director of Executive Office (ExO) of United Nations Development Programme (UNDP)  in New York. He oversaw the management of the executive office and also supported the UNDP Administrator in the executive functions of the organization.

In May 2014, Ban appointed Noudéhou as the UN Resident Coordinator and UNDP Resident Representative in the People's Republic of China where he served until 2016. He led the UN Country Team (UNCT), consisting of 21 heads of UN agencies in China.

His role in China was critical in the period 2014 to 2015, leading to the Agenda 2030  and the signing of the Paris Agreement – two global development initiatives in which China played a major role. In December 2014, the Chinese Government pledged $ 6M to respond to the Ebola outbreak which affected millions of people in West Africa. The agreement was signed into effect by the Assistant Minister of Commerce, Mr. Zhang Xiangchen and Mr. Noudéhou, on behalf of the Ebola Multi-Partner Trust Fund.

On 17 November 2014, Noudéhou delivered a speech at the School of Public Policy and Management (SPPM)  at Tsinghua University on the role of social protection in addressing equality and promoting sustainable development in China.

In August 2017, United Nations Secretary-General António Guterres, announced the appointment of Noudéhou as his Deputy Special Representative in the United Nations Mission in South Sudan (UNMISS), Resident Coordinator, Humanitarian Coordinator and UNDP Resident Coordinator. As a result of the Delinking and reinvigorated Resident Coordinator system implemented in 2018, Noudéhou later became the Deputy Special Representative of the Secretary General, Resident Coordinator and Humanitarian Coordinator in South Sudan.

The Government of the Republic of South Sudan and the UN announced on 13 December 2017 that South Sudan needs $1.7B in aid to support six million people in need of assistance. Speaking at the launch, the Humanitarian Coordinator, Alain Noudéhou said that these funds would be used to provide lifesaving assistance and protection of people most in need in South Sudan.

In December 2017, six aid workers employed by two foreign organizations and one national organization were reported missing while travelling between the towns of Raga and Wau, where they were working on food security in the Bahr el Ghazal region of South Sudan. In his capacity as Humanitarian Coordinator, Noudéhou urged for their safe return. The aid workers were later released.

References

1966 births
Living people
Beninese officials of the United Nations
United Nations Development Programme officials